Béré Region (originally known as Koyadougou Region) is one of the 31 regions of Ivory Coast. Since its establishment in 2011, it has been one of three regions in Woroba District. The seat of the region is Mankono and the region's population in the 2021 census was 492,151.

Béré is currently divided into three departments: Dianra, Kounahiri, and Mankono.

Name
In the 2011 decree that created the region, Béré was referred to exclusively as the region of "Koyadougou". Since its creation, the region has more commonly been referred to as "Béré".

Notes

 
Regions of Woroba District
States and territories established in 2011
2011 establishments in Ivory Coast